James Du Pre Alexander, 3rd Earl of Caledon (27 July 1812 – 30 June 1855), styled Viscount Alexander from birth until 1839, was a soldier and politician.

Born into an Ulster-Scots aristocratic family in London,  he was the son of The 2nd Earl of Caledon and Lady Catherine Yorke. He was educated from 1824 to 1828 at Eton College and then at Christ Church, Oxford. He was appointed High Sheriff of Armagh in 1836 and was Member of Parliament for Tyrone between 1837 and 1839. He succeeded to the title of Earl of Caledon on the death of his father on 8 April 1839. He was then elected to the House of Lords as a Representative Peer for Ireland in 1841. He gained the rank of captain in the Coldstream Guards and was Colonel of the Royal Tyrone Militia from 1 May 1839 (in succession to his father) until his death. 

He married Lady Jane Frederica Harriot Mary Grimston, daughter of James Walter Grimston, 1st Earl of Verulam and Lady Charlotte Jenkinson, on 4 September 1845 at St. Michael's, St. Albans, Hertfordshire, and had the following children:

James Alexander, 4th Earl of Caledon (11 July 1846 - 27 April 1898)
Hon. Walter Philip Alexander (9 February 1849 - 30 October 1934), a lieutenant colonel in the 2nd Dragoons (Royal Scots Greys) who served in the Second Boer War from 1899 to 1900 and married Margaret Katherine Grimston (who died 12 September 1929), daughter of Rev. the Hon. Francis Grimston, son of James Walter Grimston, 1st Earl of Verulam, and had issue.
Lady Jane Charlotte Elizabeth Alexander (1 May 1850 - 23 June 1941), who married Captain Edmund Barker Van Koughnet CMG RN JP (who died 27 March 1905), son of the Honourable Philip Michael Matthew Scott VanKoughnet  QC, former Chancellor of Ontario, and died without issue.
Hon. Charles Alexander (26 January 1854 - 27 October 1909), a major in the 3rd Battalion, Royal Inniskilling Fusiliers who in 1880 married Kate Stayner, daughter of Charles Stayner, of Halifax, Nova Scotia, and had issue.

Lord Caledon died at the age of 42 at his house in Carlton House Terrace, London, on 30 June 1855 and was buried at Caledon in County Tyrone, Ireland. Lady Caledon died on 30 March 1888.

References

External links 
 

1812 births
1855 deaths
Alumni of Christ Church, Oxford
Alexander, James
Tyrone Militia officers
High Sheriffs of Armagh
Alexander, James
People educated at Eton College
Alexander, James
UK MPs who inherited peerages
Irish representative peers
James
3